Do You Love Your Wife? is a 1919 American film starring Stan Laurel.

Cast
 Stan Laurel as The janitor
 Bunny Bixby
 Mary Burns
 Mildred Forbes
 William Gillespie
 Bud Jamison
 Gus Leonard
 Belle Mitchell
 Marie Mosquini
 Lois Neilson
 James Parrott
 William Petterson
 Charles Stevenson
 Dorothea Wolbert
 Noah Young

See also
 List of American films of 1919

References

External links

1919 films
American silent short films
American black-and-white films
1919 comedy films
1919 short films
Films directed by Hal Roach
Silent American comedy films
American comedy short films
1910s American films